Sudeshna Sinha is a professor at the Indian Institute of Science Education and Research, Mohali. She was at the Institute of Mathematical Sciences, Chennai, for over a decade. She works in the field of nonlinear physics. Her work on 'chaos-based' hardware (so-called "Chaos computing") is being developed commercially by the US-based company Chaologix.

Personal life
Sinha is married to Kapil Hari Paranjape, who is a professor of mathematics at the Indian Institute of Science Education and Research, Mohali.

Education
Sinha holds a Master of Science (Five Years Integrated Programme in Physics) from the Indian Institute of Technology, Kanpur, in 1985. She completed her Ph.D. from the Tata Institute of Fundamental Research, Mumbai, in 1990.

Career & publications
Sinha is currently a professor at the Indian Institute of Science Education and Research, Mohali and works in the field of nonlinear physics. Her research areas include Nonlinear Dynamics, Chaos, Complex Systems, Networks, and Computation. She is an Editor of the AIP journal Chaos: An Interdisciplinary Journal of Nonlinear Science  and Associate Editor of Communications in Nonlinear Science and Numerical Simulation  (Elsevier). She is also in the Editorial Boards of Pramana - Journal of Physics  and Indian Journal of Physics.

Awards

 Elected Fellow of the World Academy of Sciences, 2018 
 J.C. Bose National Fellowship (2015) 
 Elected Fellow of the Indian National Science Academy, New Delhi in 2014 
 Elected Fellow of the Indian Academy of Sciences, Bangalore in 2010 
 Awarded the B.M. Birla Prize for Physics in 1998 : The B M Birla prizes are awarded to Indian scientists, below the age of 40 years, who have made outstanding original contributions in their fields 
 Associate Member of the International Centre for Theoretical Physics, Trieste, Italy during 1995-2000 
 General Proficiency Prize from the Indian Institute of Technology, Kanpur (1985): Awarded to the "Best Outgoing Student in the master's degree (five years integrated programme in Physics) for the year"
 National Talent Search Scholarship,  during 1978-1985

References

External links 
 Chaologix

Living people
Articles created or expanded during Women's History Month (India) - 2014
Indian women physicists
20th-century Indian physicists
Bengali physicists
Fellows of the Indian National Science Academy
Year of birth missing (living people)
Place of birth missing (living people)
20th-century Indian women scientists
IIT Kanpur alumni
TWAS fellows